The Egg is the fourth studio album by post-hardcore band Shiner. It was released in 2001 on DeSoto Records.

Track listing

Personnel
 Allen Epley – vocals, guitar
 Paul Malinowski  – bass guitar, bass synth, engineering
 Jason Gerken – drums
 Josh Newton – guitar, keyboards
 Matt Talbott – keyboards
 J. Robbins – vocals, engineering
 Jason Livermore – engineering

References

External links
 thirdgearscratch The Egg

2001 albums
Shiner (band) albums
DeSoto Records albums
Albums produced by J. Robbins